Ryszard Szparak (born 2 July 1951 in Olsztyn) is a Polish former athlete who specialised in the 400 metres hurdles. He represented his country at the 1980 Summer Olympics, as well as the 1983 World Championships and two European Championships.

His personal bests are 49.17 seconds in the 400 metres hurdles (Helsinki 1983) and 46.84 seconds in the 400 metres (1983).

International competitions

References

1951 births
Living people
Polish male hurdlers
Athletes (track and field) at the 1980 Summer Olympics
Olympic athletes of Poland
Sportspeople from Olsztyn
World Athletics Championships athletes for Poland
20th-century Polish people